Paul Weatherwax (1888–1976) was an American botanist, professor of botany, and botanical illustrator.

Biography
He grew up on a farm and graduated from high school in Worthington in 1907. He taught school from 1907 to 1909 in Worthington. He took college courses at Wabash College in the spring of 1909 and at DePauw University in the summer session of 1910. From 1910 to 1911 he taught high school, first at Owensburg and then at Freedom. In the spring of 1911 he enrolled at Indiana University but he then taught high school for a year at Greencastle. He graduated from Indiana University with bachelor's degree in 1914, master's degree in 1915, and PhD in 1918. At Indiana University he was an assistant in botany from 1913 to 1915 and an instructor in botany from 1915 to 1918. From 1919 to 1921 he was an associate professor at the University of Georgia. At Indiana University he was an associate professor from 1921 to 1935 and a full professor from 1935 to 1959, when he retired as professor emeritus.

From 1960 to 1963 he was a visiting professor at Franklin College. He taught at Hanover College in 1966.

He travelled to the southeast and the southwest of the United States and to many places in Latin America in connection with his botanical research. 

For the Botanical Society of America he served as secretary from 1939 to 1943 and as vice-president in 1944 and again in 1957. He was president of the Indiana Academy of Science in 1941. He held a Waterman fellowship from 1925 to 1930 and a Guggenheim traveling fellowship for the academic year 1944–1945.

He married Anna May Stanton in June 1916. They had several children.

Selected publications

Articles
 
 
 
 
 
 
 
 
 with Dorothy W. Sanders and Leland S. McClung: 
  (See De Historia Stirpium Commentarii Insignes.)

Books

References

1888 births
1976 deaths
20th-century American botanists
Indiana University alumni
Indiana University faculty
People from Greene County, Indiana